The 2015 Ladies European Tour is a series of golf tournaments for elite female golfers from around the world, which takes place from February through December 2015. The tournaments are sanctioned by the Ladies European Tour (LET).

Schedule
The table below partially shows the 2015 schedule. The numbers in brackets after the winners' names indicate the career wins on the Ladies European Tour, including that event, and is only shown for members of the tour.

Key

Order of Merit rankings

See also
2015 LPGA Tour

External links
Official site of the Ladies European Tour
Ladies European Tour Information Centre

Ladies European Tour
Ladies European Tour
Ladies European Tour